Jason Witt (born November 7, 1986) is a retired American mixed martial artist who last competed in the Welterweight division of the Ultimate Fighting Championship.

Background 
Witt started training around 2009 with his uncle, who used to be a professional kickboxer.

Mixed martial arts career

Early career 
Witt fought locally in the Missouri regionals, debuting on April 3, 2009. His debut in the amateur ranks was a loss against Tyler Johnson. He turned professional in March 2013 and won his first match on April 26 in Shamrock Fighting Championships, defeating Nick Felix. Witt would then compete in such organizations as Shamrock FC, Titan FC, and Bellator MMA, and Legacy Fighting Alliance.

Ultimate Fighting Championship 
Witt made his UFC debut as a welterweight on June 27, 2020 at UFC Fight Night: Poirier vs Hooker, replacing Ramiz Brahimaj as the opponent of Takashi Sato. He lost the fight via TKO in round one.

Witt faced Cole Williams on October 31, 2020 at UFC Fight Night: Hall vs. Silva. At the weigh-ins, Cole Williams missed weight, weighing in at 175.5 pounds, four and a half pounds over the welterweight non-title fight limit. The bout proceeded at catchweight and Williams was fined a percentage of his individual purse, Jason Witt. Witt dominated the bout and secured a second round submission win.

Witt faced Matthew Semelsberger on March 13, 2021 at UFC Fight Night: Edwards vs. Muhammad. He lost the fight via knockout out in round one.

As the last bout of his rookie contract, Witt faced Bryan Barberena on July 31, 2021 at UFC on ESPN 28. He won the fight via majority decision. This fight earned him the Fight of the Night award.

As the first bout of his new, four-fight contract Witt faced Philip Rowe on February 5, 2022 at UFC Fight Night: Hermansson vs. Strickland. He lost the fight via technical knockout in round two.

Witt was scheduled to face Josh Quinlan on August 6, 2022 at UFC on ESPN: Santos vs. Hill. but was pushed back one week to UFC on ESPN 41 due to Josh Quinlan being pulled from the event for an atypical drug finding; long-term metabolite (or M3 metabolite) of the steroid dehydrochloromethyltestosterone (DHCMT) in a urine sample. Witt lost the fight via knockout in round one.

On October 30, 2022, Witt announced his retirement from MMA.

Championships and achievements 
 Ultimate Fighting Championship
 Fight of the Night (One time) 
Kansas City Fighting Alliance
KC Fighting Alliance Welterweight Championship (One time) 
Four successful title defenses

Mixed martial arts record

|-
|Loss
|align=center|19–9
|Josh Quinlan
|KO (punch)
|UFC on ESPN: Vera vs. Cruz
|
|align=center|1
|align=center|2:09
|San Diego, California, United States
|
|-
|Loss
| align=center|19–8
|Philip Rowe
|TKO (punches)
|UFC Fight Night: Hermansson vs. Strickland
| 
|align=center|2
|align=center|2:15
|Las Vegas, Nevada, United States
|
|-
|Win
|align=center|19–7
|Bryan Barberena
|Decision (majority)
|UFC on ESPN: Hall vs. Strickland 
|
|align=center|3
|align=center|5:00
|Las Vegas, Nevada, United States
|
|-
| Loss
| align=center|18–7
| Matthew Semelsberger
| KO (punch)
|UFC Fight Night: Edwards vs. Muhammad
|
|align=center|1
|align=center|0:16
|Las Vegas, Nevada, United States
| 
|-
| Win
| align=center| 18–6
|Cole Williams
| Submission (arm-triangle choke)
| UFC Fight Night: Hall vs. Silva
| 
| align=center| 2
| align=center| 2:09
| Las Vegas, Nevada, United States
| 
|-
| Loss
| align=center| 17–6
| Takashi Sato
|TKO (punches)
|UFC on ESPN: Poirier vs. Hooker
|
|align=center|1
|align=center|0:48
|Las Vegas, Nevada, United States
|
|-
| Win
| align=center|17–5
| Zak Bucia
| Decision (unanimous)
| Fighting Alliance Championship 2
| 
| align=center| 3
| align=center| 5:00
| Independence, Missouri, United States
|
|-
| Win
| align=center|16–5
| Roberto Neves
| Decision (unanimous)
| Final Fight Championship 40
| 
| align=center|3
| align=center|5:00
| Las Vegas, Nevada, United States
| 
|-
| Win
| align=center| 15–5
| Cliff Wright
|Decision (unanimous)
|Kansas City Fighting Alliance 34
|
|align=center|3
|align=center|5:00
|Independence, Missouri, United States
| 
|-
| Win
| align=center| 14–5
| Ashkan Morvari
| Submission (rear-naked choke)
|LFA 50
|
|align=center|3
|align=center|1:01
|Prior Lake, Minnesota, United States
| 
|-
| Loss
| align=center| 13–5
| Hugh Pulley
| TKO (punches)
|  Stronger Men's Conference 2018
| 
| align=center| 2
| align=center| 1:44
| Springfield, Missouri, United States
| 
|-
|  Win
| align=center| 13–4
| Mark Lemminger
| TKO (punches)
| Chosen Few FC 13
| 
| align=center| 3
| align=center| 1:38
| Madison, Wisconsin, United States
| 
|-
|  Win
| align=center| 12–4
| Ty Freeman
| Decision (unanimous)
|LFA 29
|
|align=center|3
|align=center|5:00
|Prior Lake, Minnesota, United States
|
|-
| Win
| align=center| 11–4
| Jake Lindsey
|Decision (unanimous)
|Kansas City Fighting Alliance 25
|
|align=center|3
|align=center|5:00
|Independence, Missouri, United States
| 
|-
| Win
| align=center| 10–4
| Kenny Licea
| KO (punch)
|Carden Combat Sports 2
|
|align=center|2 
|align=center|0:09
|Kansas City, Missouri, United States
|
|-
| Win
| align=center| 9–4
| Wade Johnson
|Submission (rear-naked choke)
|Pyramid Fights 2
|
|align=center|1
|align=center|2:37
|Searcy, Arkansas, United States
|
|-
| Loss
| align=center| 8–4
|Justin Patterson
| TKO (punches)
| Bellator 174
| 
| align=center| 3
| align=center| 0:13
| Thackerville, Oklahoma, United States
|
|-
| Win
| align=center|8–3
| Craig Eckelberg
| Submission (rear-naked choke)
| Kansas City Fighting Alliance 21
| 
| align=center|1
| align=center|4:31
| Independence, Missouri, United States
|
|-
| Loss
| align=center|7–3
| Dakota Cochrane
|Submission (rear-naked choke)
|Victory FC 52
|
|align=center|2
|align=center|3:17
|Omaha, Nebraska, United States
|
|-
| Win
| align=center|7–2
| Isaac Vallie-Flagg
| DQ (illegal knee)
| Titan FC 34
| 
| align=center| 3
| align=center| 1:54
| Kansas City, Missouri, United States
|
|-
| Win
| align=center|6–2
| Ryan Dickson
|TKO (punches)
| GWFC 2
| 
| align=center|1
| align=center|1:00
| Burlington, Ontario, Canada
|
|-
| Win
| align=center| 5–2
| Josh Tulley
| Decision (unanimous)
| Kansas City Fighting Alliance 14
| 
| align=center| 3
| align=center| 5:00
| Independence, Missouri, United States
| 
|-
| Win
| align=center| 4–2
| Jeremy Small
| Submission (rear-naked choke)
| Kansas City Fighting Alliance 13
|
|align=Center|1
|align=center|1:16
|Independence, Missouri, United States
| 
|-
| Loss
| align=center| 3–2
| Jeremiah Denson
| Submission (guillotine choke)
| Shamrock FC: High Stakes
| 
| align=center| 1
| align=center| 2:54
|Kansas City, Missouri, United States
| 
|-
| Win
| align=center| 3–1
| Tommy O'Neal
| Submission (rear-naked choke)
|Epic Fight Night 2
|
|align=center|1
|align=center|0:42
| Kansas City, Missouri, United States
| 
|-
| Loss
| align=center| 2–1
|Chance Rencountre
|TKO (punches)
|Titan FC 26
|
|align=center|2
|align=center|0:56
|Kansas City, Missouri, United States
| 
|-
| Win
| align=center| 2–0
| Nick Felix
| Submission (rear-naked choke)
| Shamrock FC: Fight Night
| 
| align=center| 1
| align=center| 1:37
| Kansas City, Missouri, United States
|
|-
| Win
| align=center| 1–0
| Henry Lindsay
| Submission (rear-naked choke)
| Centurion Fights
| 
| align=center| 1
| align=center| 2:09
| St. Joseph, Missouri, United States
|

See also 
 List of male mixed martial artists

References

External links 
  
 

1986 births
Living people
American male mixed martial artists
Mixed martial artists from Missouri
Welterweight mixed martial artists
Mixed martial artists utilizing kickboxing
Mixed martial artists utilizing Brazilian jiu-jitsu
Sportspeople from Kansas City, Missouri
Ultimate Fighting Championship male fighters
American practitioners of Brazilian jiu-jitsu